The coat of arms of Saint Petersburg is the official symbol of the city and was adopted in 23 April 2003.

History

The historical coat of arms of St. Petersburg was approved in 1730, confirmed in 1780, and amended in 1857. It had never been declined and was brought back into use in 1991. The coats of arms of the Holy See and Vatican City (the original "city of St. Peter") served as the prototype for the coat of arms of St. Petersburg.

After the October Revolution, and until the collapse of the Soviet Union (from 1917 to 1991), the city's coat of arms was not used. It bore the symbol of imperial power, which was incompatible with the official ideology of the Soviet regime, and the widespread use of city emblems and flags did not exist in the Soviet tradition. Arbitrary symbols, such as a boat from the spire of the Admiralty were more commonly used.

Only in the spring of 1989 did the city government of Leningrad re-consider the need for a city emblem. A citywide competition was declared to design one with a cash prize to be awarded to the winner. An exhibition was held to display the candidates in May 1989 in the Peter and Paul Fortress. The Russian Historical Society opposed this initiative and organized protests, petitioning for the revival of the historical coat of arms of St. Petersburg (video of the event was shown on TV and were reported in the local media). As a result, the idea of establishing a new Soviet emblem of the Northern capital was abandoned, with public opinion favouring the revival of the existing city emblem, and this was officially re-enacted in 1991.

The current coat of arms was adopted on 23 April 2003.

Description 
The coat of arms of Saint Petersburg is a red heraldic shield with a field featuring two silver anchors. The Maritime anchor is oriented diagonally from left to right from the viewer, with two legs in the upper left corner, and the River anchor mirrors its position, with four legs in the upper right corner. Above them is a golden scepter with a double-headed eagle. The shield is crowned with an imperial crown with two St. Andrew azure ribbons emerging from it. Behind the shield two are crosswise gold scepters adorned with diamonds connected by St Andrew azure ribbons.

The heraldic description of the coat of arms of St. Petersburg states: "In the dark red field gold Russian scepter over two overturned silver anchors sea and river, about four teeth, crosswise. The shield is crowned Russian imperial crown and put it on top of two Russian scepter natural color connected ribbon of St. Andrew."

The coat of arms of St Petersburg may also be reproduced in abbreviated versions, for both historical and heraldic purposes. The imperial crown can be omitted, as can its ribbons, along with the two Russian scepters and double-headed eagle but the two silver anchors - sea and river, laid crosswise remain constant.

The scepters represent the rulers of St Petersburg. In this case, a scepter surmounted by an eagle symbolised monarchical royal power, and that St. Petersburg was the capital of the Russian Empire. The two silver anchors, one of which was two-bladed with a cross in the ring representing the sea, and the other, with four blades and a ring representing the river, meant that the city was both a sea and river port. The red of the shield recalls the bloody battles against the Swedes in the Great Northern War.

See also

Flag of Saint Petersburg

References
 LAW OF SAINT PETERSBURG (# 165-23) for a detailed description of the official symbols of St. Petersburg and procedures
 Движение за Санкт-Петербург: история зарождения, борьбы и победы 1989-1991 гг.
 Coat of arms of the city of Saint-Petersburg

External links

Culture in Saint Petersburg
History of Saint Petersburg
Saint Petersburg
Saint Petersburg
Saint Petersburg